The Sterrofustia are one of the three orders of solenogaster.

The status of this order is uncertain, as it is deemed not monophyletic.

Taxonomy
Families and genera include:

 Heteroherpiidae
 Heteroherpia
 Imeroherpiidae
 Imeroherpia
 Phyllomeniidae
 Harpagoherpia
 Lituiherpia
 Ocheyoherpia
 Phyllomenia

References